Tomás Felipe Carlovich (19 April 1946 – 8 May 2020), nicknamed El Trinche, was an Argentine professional football player and coach. His position on the field was central midfielder, playing in several clubs although he is mostly associated with Central Córdoba, where he became an idol and the most representative player of the club along with Gabino Sosa.

Due to his ball control and dribbling ability, many people saw Carlovich as a pure representative of creole football, although he had played only a few matches in the top division of Argentine football. Carlovich was even compared with Diego Maradona when some referred to him as "the Maradona that never was" because of his bohemian style of life and his refusal to play in clubs outside Argentina. AC Milan and some French clubs tried to sign him, but Carlovich denied the offers. At the end of his career, Brazilian star Pelé tried to convince him to play for the New York Cosmos but he also refused.

Carlovich also had a brief stint as coach in Central Córdoba, although he stated that he was not interested in taking over the senior squad again after resigning.

Career 
Carlovich grew up in Belgrano neighborhood, Rosario. Carlovich was of Croatian descent: his father, Mario Karlović, was an immigrant from Zagreb. Once settled in San Francisco de Santa Fe he met Carlovich's mother, Elvira Vega. At the end of the 1960s decade he began to play football in Rosario Central, but he received most recognition during his tenure in Central Córdoba. Playing for Central Córdoba, Carlovich won the promotions of 1973 and 1982.

He also played in Colón de Santa Fe and Independiente Rivadavia (team which defeated Internazionale in a friendly match, with Carlovich as part of the line-up), and Deportivo Maipú. Carlovich retired definitely in 1986.

The historical "forward and back nutmeg"
During a match between Central Córdoba and Talleres de Remedios de Escalada, a supporter encouraged Carlovich to make a double nutmeg, moving the ball first forward, then back. This request was immediately fulfilled by "El Trinche", causing a huge ovation from his fans in the grandstand. This nutmeg would be repeated many times by Carlovich during his career.

The 1974 consecration
The last match as a preparation for the 1974 World Cup found the Argentina national football team going to Rosario to play a friendly game against a squad formed exclusively by players born in that city. Some of the Rosarian players were prominent footballers, such as Mario Zanabria, Daniel Killer, Carlos Aimar and Carlovich as well.

At the end of the first half, the team from Rosario led 3-0. The supremacy of the local team was so big that the Argentina national team coach, Vladislao Cap, asked for his colleague to exclude Carlovich for the second half, and this is what finally happened. The final score was 3–1

Death
On 6 May 2020, Carlovich was assaulted and beaten by a young man who stole his bicycle. Carlovich fell and hit his head on the ground, and died two days later.

Recognition
Carlovich is considered one of the best Argentine football players ever. José Pekerman chose him as the best central midfielder he had ever seen; César Luis Menotti said, "Carlovich is one of those kids whose unique toy has been a ball since they were born. Watching him playing football was impressive". Diego Maradona, when arriving at Newell's Old Boys and after being defined by a journalist as "the best footballer", replied: "The best footballer has already played in Rosario, and his name is Carlovich". In February 2020, when Gimnasia y Esgrima La Plata went to Rosario to play Rosario Central, Maradona met Carlovich and expressed his admiration again, saying to him "you were better than me".

In his own words

References

External links

 Dicen que fue mejor que Maradona, Interview to Carlovich on Revista Catalina, September 9, 2010 (archived)

1949 births
2020 deaths
Argentine footballers
Argentine people of Croatian descent
Footballers from Rosario, Santa Fe
Independiente Rivadavia footballers
Club Atlético Colón footballers
Central Córdoba de Rosario footballers
Rosario Central footballers
Association football midfielders
Flandria footballers
Deportivo Maipú players
Deaths by beating